Mariusz Gil (born 6 May 1983) is a Polish male  cyclo-cross cyclist. He represented his nation in the men's elite event at the 2016 UCI Cyclo-cross World Championships  in Heusden-Zolder.

References

External links
 
 
 
 

1983 births
Living people
Cyclo-cross cyclists
Polish male cyclists
Place of birth missing (living people)